During the 1996–97 English football season, Southend United F.C. competed in the Football League First Division.

Season summary
The 1996–97 season was a big struggle for Southend as they suffered relegation after finishing bottom of Division One. Ronnie Whelan left the club and he openly admitted when he took the job he didn't know the first thing about being a manager.

Final league table

Results
Southend United's score comes first

Legend

Football League First Division

FA Cup

League Cup

Squad

References

Southend United F.C. seasons
Southend United